Ţânţăreni or Ţînţăreni may refer to several places in Romania:

Țânțăreni, Gorj, a commune in Gorj County
 Ţânţăreni, a village in Blejoi Commune, Prahova County

and in Moldova:

Ţînţăreni, Anenii Noi, a commune in Anenii Noi district
Ţînţăreni, Teleneşti, a commune in Teleneşti district